This is a list of hillside letters (also known as mountain monograms) in the U.S. state of Idaho. There are at least 36 hillside letters, acronyms, and messages in the state, possibly as many as 42.

References

External links

 Mountain Monograms, a website explaining the origins and with an incomplete list and pictures
 Hillside Letters, a companion website to a book on the subject
 Letters on Hills, a category on waymarking.com for geocachers

Idaho
Hillside letters,Idaho